Xu Shousheng (23 January 1953 – 5 December 2020) was a Chinese politician. He was the Communist Party Secretary of Hunan from 2013 to 2016. He served as the Governor of Hunan and Gansu provinces.

Biography
Xu was born in Rudong County, Jiangsu. He joined the Chinese Communist Party in October 1973, and is an alumnus of Southeast University, though it is not clear when he graduated. He began working for the party in the grassroots, first as a commune leader, then head of the revolutionary committee of his home township, then deputy governor of his home county.  In October 1985, he became county governor of Rudong, then in 1990 was elevated to party chief. In December 1991 he became mayor of Lianyungang, and in July 1996, became party chief of Suqian, the first person to hold this position after Suqian was established as a prefecture-level city. He entered the Jiangsu provincial party standing committee in December 2000, ascending to sub-provincial level at the age of 47; he oversaw poverty reduction and rural affairs work.

He was transferred from Jiangsu to Gansu in September 2001 when he was appointed to head the Gansu provincial organization department.  In January 2003 he was named executive vice governor of Gansu. Xu Shousheng was then appointed as Governor of Gansu in January 2007. He was re-elected by the Gansu Provincial People's Congress on January 26, 2008.

As Governor of Gansu, Xu was responsible for the personnel, environmental, economic, political and foreign policy of the province. The Governorship ranks second in the province behind the Chinese Communist Party Provincial Committee Secretary. In 2013, he became provincial party chief. In August 2016, he was relieved of his position as party chief of Hunan. On September 3, 2016, he was appointed a vice chair of the National People's Congress Agriculture and Rural Affairs Committee.

He died of illness in Nanjing on December 5, 2020.

References

1953 births
2020 deaths
Governors of Hunan
Governors of Gansu
Politicians from Nantong
People's Republic of China politicians from Jiangsu
Chinese Communist Party politicians from Jiangsu
People from Rudong County